Interplay may refer to:

 Interplay (John Coltrane album), 1957
 Interplay (Bill Evans album), 1962
 Interplay (Al Haig album), 1976
 Interplay Records, an American jazz label
 Interplay (ballet), by Jerome Robbins, 1945
 Interplay (magazine), a 1980s gaming magazine
 Interplay Entertainment, a video game developer and publisher
 Interplay Europe, a festival for young playwrights in Europe
 World Interplay, an Australian young playwrights festival